Vusumuzi "Vuza" Nyoni (born 21 April 1984, in Bulawayo) is a Zimbabwean professional football player, most recently playing for SC Dikkelvenne. His position on the field is left-winger. He is nicknamed Prince.

Career
Nyoni was discovered at his team Highlanders FC by scouts of Premier League side Blackburn Rovers. Cercle Brugge, co-operating with Blackburn Rovers, offered Nyoni a trial because they needed a replacement for Brian Pinas who was sold to NAC Breda. A few weeks later, Vusumuzi Nyoni signed a contract for six months. This contract has already been prolonged with two years.

Nyoni currently lives together with his teammate Honour Gombami in a flat in Bruges. It was Nyoni who recommended Gombami at Cercle, and they both recommended Obadiah Tarumbwa. Nyoni is the son of Highlanders gifted left back Dumisani "Savimbi" Nyoni, who played during the famous Bulawayo club's heyday in the mid eighties.

On Wednesday 25 August 2010 Nyoni signed a three-year contract with Germinal Beerschot.

References

External links
 Vusumuzi Nyoni player info at the Cercle Brugge official site 
 Cerclemuseum.be 
 Vuza Nyoni at Footballdatabase

Living people
1984 births
Zimbabwean footballers
Zimbabwe international footballers
Highlanders F.C. players
Cercle Brugge K.S.V. players
Beerschot A.C. players
R.A.E.C. Mons players
Belgian Pro League players
Association football wingers
Sportspeople from Bulawayo
Expatriate footballers in Belgium
Royal FC Mandel United players